Mbaqanga is an album by the South African musical group Mahlathini and the Mahotella Queens, released in 1991 and in the US in 1992. The group supported the album with a North American tour.

Production
The album was produced by Marks Mankwane, who also played guitar. The group rerecorded a few early hits for Mbaqanga. The Makhona Tsohle Band played on the album. Mahlathini and the Mahotella Queens returned to the more traditional sound of their earlier albums; they also continued to shy away from political lyrics. The group sang in Zulu, Shangaan, and English, among other languages.

Critical reception

The Chicago Tribune noted Mankwane's influence, deeming the album "a leaner, rootsier record ... that is also more akin to current popular African guitar band styles." The Boston Globe praised the "less punched up, club-ready mix [that is] closer to a lighter, dustier, urban folk sound." The Sacramento Bee wrote: "While Simon Mahlathini Nkabinde's uncommon voice, low and gruff like Tom Waits' African cousin, is an acquired taste (that is, difficult to acquire), the three Queens are immediately ingratiating a bright, brassy ensemble that sings as one, reflecting their 28 years together."

The Globe and Mail determined that "the music remains unalloyed and uncorrupted, a joyous and irresistible sound that can light up a room in seconds." The Houston Chronicle considered the album "a good representation of Mahlathini and the Mahotella Queens' distinctive vocal blend of growling male leads ... and female harmonies." The Times Union labeled it "joyously buoyant."

AllMusic called the album "a nonstop frenzy of Zulu rock & roll."

Track listing

Charts

References

Mahlathini and the Mahotella Queens albums
1992 albums
Verve Records albums